During the Pacific War of 1941–1945, the Imperial Japanese Navy Air Service disposed of an increasing number of "air fleets" - airborne combat units attached to the Navy. The 1st Air Fleet was the primary carrier unit, while other Air Fleets were for defence, training or supporting naval operations in particular theatres.

1st Air Fleet

The  formed the primary carrier fleet of the Imperial Japanese Navy (IJN), a grouping of naval aircraft and aircraft carriers that at the time of the attack on Pearl Harbor, was the world's largest aircraft carrier fleet.  As losses mounted, the carriers were removed and the 1st Air Fleet was transformed into a land based Naval aviation force forward based on islands and land masses along the perimeter of the Japanese controlled sphere.

2nd Air Fleet
The  was organized late in the War to defend the National Defence Zone along with 1st Air Fleet.  Their area of responsibility was based in the Kyūshū-Okinawa-Formosa district. In October 1944 Vice admiral Shigeru Fukudome moved his HQ from Taiwan to Manila.  There he was reinforced and charged with a share of the air defense of the Philippines. However, most of the airplanes and pilots disappeared in November 1944 as a result of fighting against the Halsey Fleet from the front during the Philippines campaign.  Soon thereafter, in Jan 1945, the 2nd Air Fleet was dissolved and merged into the 1st Air Fleet.

3rd Air Fleet
The  was in charge of air defense of Eastern Japan.

5th Air Fleet
The  was in charge of the air defense of Western Japan.

10th Air Fleet
The  was a training unit.

11th Air Fleet

The  was a grouping of naval aviation and surface units based in Formosa that moved through the Philippines and New Guinea then supported the Solomon Islands campaign during the Japanese advance at the start of the war.  Heavily engaged in the Guadalcanal Campaign.  From the end of 1942 they provided air cover to the Southeast Area Fleet.

12th Air Fleet
The  was in charge of air cover for the Northeast Area Fleet.

13th Air Fleet
The  was in charge of air cover for the Southwest Area Fleet.

14th Air Fleet
The  was in charge of air cover for the Central Pacific Area.

Footnotes

Air Service
Air Service
 
Air Service
Air Fleets